Hubert Leitgeb may refer to:

 Hubert Leitgeb (biathlete) (1965–2012), Italian biathlete
 Hubert Leitgeb (botanist) (1835–1888), Austrian botanist